Abu Sayed Matiul Hannan Shah (known as Hannan Shah; 11 October 1941 – 27 September 2016) was a Bangladeshi politician and army officer from Gazipur District. He served as the jute minister and a Jatiya Sangsad member representing the Gazipur-4 constituency during 1991–1996.

Early life 
Shah was born in Ghagtia, Kapasia, Gazipur District in the-then British India. His father, Fakir Abdul Mannan, was a minister in the Pakistan government during 1965–1968. In 1962, Hannan Shah was commissioned in Pakistan Army. Shah's younger brother, Shah Abu Nayeem Mominur Rahman, was a judge in the Supreme Court's Appellate Division.

Career
Shah retired from the Bangladesh Army as a Brigadier general in 1981. He joined Bangladesh Nationalist Party in 1983. He served as the standing committee member of the Bangladesh Nationalist Party. Shah served as the Minister of Jute during 1991–96.

On 25 November 2013, Shah was arrested by Bangladesh Police from his residence.

Personal life and death
Shah was married to Nahid Hannan. Together they had one daughter, Sharmin Hannan and two sons, Shah Rezaul Hannan and Shah Reazul Hannan.

In January 2015, Shah was hospitalized to Combined Military Hospital in Dhaka with respiratory problems. He died at the age of 74 in Singapore while undergoing treatment for heart disease on 27 September 2016.

References 

1941 births
2016 deaths
Bangladesh Army brigadiers
Bangladesh Nationalist Party politicians
Textiles and Jute ministers of Bangladesh
5th Jatiya Sangsad members
6th Jatiya Sangsad members
20th-century Bengalis
21st-century Bengalis
People from Kapasia Upazila